Legislative elections to elect members of the Cisleithanian Imperial Council were held in the Czech lands over several days in May 1907.
The Czech lands (Kingdom of Bohemia, Margraviate of Moravia and the Duchy of Upper and Lower Silesia) elected 194 out of the 516 seats in the Imperial Council. 

These elections were the first which were held under universal male suffrage, after an electoral reform abolishing tax paying requirements for voters had been adopted by the Council and was endorsed by Emperor Franz Joseph earlier in the year. The elections meant huge gains for the social democratic and agrarian parties while the national liberal parties lost ground.

Results

See also 
1907 Cisleithanian legislative election

References

1907 elections in Europe
1907
1907 in Austria-Hungary
June 1907 events